Valery Semyonov (Russian: Валерий Владимирович Семёнов; born 16 September 1960) is a Russian politician serving as a senator from the Legislative Assembly of Krasnoyarsk Krai since 28 September 2017.

Valery Semyonov is under personal sanctions introduced by the European Union, the United Kingdom, the USA, Canada, Switzerland, Australia, Ukraine, New Zealand, for ratifying the decisions of the "Treaty of Friendship, Cooperation and Mutual Assistance between the Russian Federation and the Donetsk People's Republic and between the Russian Federation and the Luhansk People's Republic" and providing political and economic support for Russia's annexation of Ukrainian territories.

Biography

Valery Semyonov was born on 16 September 1960 in Cherkessk, Karachay-Cherkess Autonomous Oblast. In 1998, he graduated from the Norilsk Industrial Institute. From 1997 to 2000, he was the first deputy head of Norilsk. In February 2001, Semyonov was appointed Deputy General Director of the Norilsk Nickel enterprise. From 2001 to 2007, he was also the deputy of Legislative Assembly of Krasnoyarsk Krai of the 3rd convocation. On 4 December 2011, he became the deputy of the Legislative Assembly of Krasnoyarsk Krai of the 2nd convocation (which was created after merging Krasnoyarsk Krai with Taymyr Autonomous Okrug with Evenk Autonomous Okrug). On 3 April 2014, he became the senator from the Legislative Assembly of Krasnoyarsk Krai.

References

Living people
1960 births
United Russia politicians
21st-century Russian politicians
People from Cherkessk
Members of the Federation Council of Russia (after 2000)